La Caméra invisible was a French television show created by Jacques Rouland, Pierre Bellemare and directed by Igor Barrère.

Premise

La Caméra was a French adaptation of the American hidden camera show Candid Camera. The premise of the show was practical jokes were played on unsuspecting members of the public. It was first broadcast from April 1964 to 1971.

References

1964 French television series debuts
1971 French television series endings
French-language television shows
Hidden camera television series